On April 22, 2019, a Northrop N-9MB aircraft crashed in Norco, California, United States, killing the pilot. The aircraft was the last survivor of four built and was destroyed in the crash. Investigators attributed the accident to the "pilot's loss of control", but were unable to conclusively determine a cause for the control loss, as severe impact damage to the engines, flight controls and propellers "precluded functional testing".

Accident
Shortly after take-off from Chino Airport, the aircraft crashed on the grounds of the California Rehabilitation Center, a state prison in Norco, California, at 12:10 pm local time. The pilot had been performing a test flight at low altitude following the completion of the aircraft's annual inspection.

Ground witnesses—including at least one qualified pilot—saw the aircraft flying straight and level at what sounded like a normal cruise power setting when it pitched up into a climb, banked to the left, and then "abruptly" rolled to the right. The engines sputtered as the aircraft rolled inverted, and then increased in volume and RPM as the aircraft went into a "diving right corkscrew turn." Some witnesses described the aircraft wobbling as it turned, and one witness saw the canopy separate from the aircraft. The aircraft then disappeared behind a tree line and a plume of black smoke was seen.

Radar data obtained by the National Transportation Safety Board (NTSB) did not reveal the aircraft's altitude when it departed from level flight.

A post-crash fire was extinguished by firefighters.

Aircraft
The aircraft involved was the Northrop N-9MB, the sole remaining Northrop N-9M, registration N9MB. One of four built, it was operated by the Planes of Fame Air Museum, Chino, California. The aircraft was being operated under an experimental airworthiness certificate and had 732.8 flight hours at the time of the annual inspection.

Crew
The pilot and sole aircraft occupant was killed but no ground casualties were reported. The 51-year-old male pilot was a certified flight instructor and held an airline transport pilot certificate. He held type ratings for various modern and historical aircraft, and had accrued 20,029 hours of total flight time, including 25 flight hours in the accident aircraft over a 4-year period. He was wearing a parachute during the accident flight.

Investigation
The NTSB opened an investigation under accident number WPR19FA118.

The aircraft crashed in an outpatient housing yard of the prison complex, and had touched down right wingtip first, as evidenced by a ground scar consistent with the green plastic right wing navigation light lens.

The NTSB recovered the wreckage for further examination. Various parts of the flight control system, propellers and engines were identified, but most showed signs of impact damage, and the engines were "severely fragmented". Various control cables were found separated by impact forces although safety clips or safety wire were still in place. The aircraft seatbelt was found unbuckled.

Post-crash toxicological testing found traces of ethanol and pseudoephedrine or ephedrine in the pilot's body, but the NTSB concluded that the concentrations were too small to be a contributing factor, and ruled out alcohol intoxication.

The NTSB final report states that the crash was caused by the "pilot's loss of control for undetermined reasons", stating that "given the significant fragmentation of the wreckage, the reason for the loss of control could not be determined from the available information." Based on the eyewitness reports, the unbuckled seatbelt, and the location of the canopy relative to the main impact site, the NTSB said that the pilot may have attempted to egress by parachute, but did not have adequate time to do so before ground impact.

References

Aviation accidents and incidents in the United States in 2019
Aviation accidents and incidents in California
2019 in California
Riverside County, California
Death in Riverside County, California